Farmington Township, Pennsylvania is the name of several places in the state of Pennsylvania, United States.
Farmington Township, Clarion County, Pennsylvania
Farmington Township, Tioga County, Pennsylvania
Farmington Township, Warren County, Pennsylvania

Pennsylvania township disambiguation pages